Lie with Me is a 2005 Canadian erotic drama film directed by Clement Virgo, based on the 2001 novel of the same name by Tamara Faith Berger. The film stars Lauren Lee Smith and Eric Balfour. Its plot concerns an outgoing, sexually aggressive young woman who meets and begins a torrid affair with an equally aggressive young man, which brings a strain on their personal lives. The film contains graphic, unsimulated sexual content.

The film was set and shot in Toronto (primarily The Annex). It premiered at the 2005 Toronto International Film Festival.

Included in the soundtrack is music by Broken Social Scene and Annelise Noronha.

Plot
The camera slowly zooms out on a young woman masturbating to a porn sex tape. She gets up abruptly and goes out to a party, looking for sex. Leila has learned she has some power over men with sex but feels a part of her is still untouched, holding back, despite her assertiveness. Before she can choose a partner for the night she is corralled by David, into a bathroom, while his girlfriend calls through the door. She leaves, but keeps her eye on David as she picks up a shy guy, with whom she has sex against a fence outside as David watches from his car while his girlfriend, Victoria (Polly Shannon) fellates him. Leila is in complete control of her encounter while David remains completely passive.

He next sees her walking down the street and follows her. She smiles but does not speak to him and breaks into a run, leading him to a playground. They crouch inside a small tunnel and watch each other as she begins to touch herself. But this time he leaves.

When Leila sees David again, they finally speak to each other, and he takes her home, where they have sex. He asks Leila if she will go out with him on a real date, giving her his number when she leaves.

They finally do go out and begin a real romance. She meets his father, who is physically fragile but very funny, teasing her about having sex and making noise in their apartment. David cares very tenderly for his father, who is charmingly brusque. Leila is still skittish, although she is not intimidated when David's old girlfriend, Victoria (Polly Shannon) confronts her at her job, warning her that David has intimacy issues. When they go back to the club again, Leila dances suggestively with a couple of men while watching David's reaction, and he is hurt and angry when they return to his place. She brushes off his fears when he confesses that he thinks of nothing but her, that he needs her, but she acts like it is all a game. He begs to her to promise that she will not leave him, and she does, but does not believe it herself.

When David finds his father dead, he turns to Leila for consolation, but she does not know how to comfort him. This leads to conflict and ends with him asking her to leave. Later, he reconsiders; but he is unable to find Leila again, as he knows nothing about her except her first name. Leila finds her sexual world more and more unsatisfying and becomes increasingly frustrated. She picks up the shy guy again, but strikes at him in anger when he is unable to follow her peremptory commands, and throws him out of her apartment in disgust.

Leila spends time with her parents as they go their separate ways and gets ready for the wedding while the summer is coming to an end. As she rides her bicycle to the ceremony, David sees her and follows in his truck. He waits outside the synagogue and approaches her as everyone floods out onto the sidewalk following the wedding, and then Rachel (Kristin Lehman) grabs Leila's hand and she calls out to David, to ask if he is coming. At the reception David watches Leila dance with an old man, but she runs away again when he approaches her. This time he follows her all the way home, and all the way inside, telling her he will not leave her again. They reunite and the film ends with the two engaging in a passionate kiss.

Cast

Lauren Lee Smith said that when she got a call from her agent on the requirements for the role of Leila, which clearly included not only nudity but on-camera live sex, she thought he was kidding. Then she read the script and recognized its origins. Clement Virgo asked her to audition with Eric Balfour, whom he'd interviewed in Los Angeles. Virgo got them into a room to see the chemistry between them because he knew that without chemistry they had no movie. "There was apparently chemistry," Smith later affirmed, giving a giddy laugh.

Reception
Lie with Me received a 38% "Rotten" rating on Rotten Tomatoes. Writing for Variety, Leslie Felperin says that "Barry Stone's lensing, favoring a soft, Northern-climes afternoon light for the sex scenes in particular, looks dreamy throughout", but that "with its drawn-out last act and sentimental ending, [this] pic is a long way from being the Gen-Y Last Tango in Paris it would like to think it is."

Ron Mashate, writing for Stylus Magazine, concurred in part:

References

External links
 
 
 

2000s erotic drama films
2005 independent films
2005 romantic drama films
2005 films
Canadian erotic drama films
Canadian independent films
Canadian romantic drama films
English-language Canadian films
2000s English-language films
Erotic romance films
Films based on Canadian novels
Films directed by Clement Virgo
Films set in Toronto
Films shot in Toronto
2000s Canadian films
English-language drama films